The 1977 Allan Cup was the Canadian senior ice hockey championship for the 1976–77 senior "A" season.  The event was hosted by the Brantford Alexanders in Brantford, Ontario.  The 1977 playoff marked the 69th time that the Allan Cup has been awarded.

Teams
Brantford Alexanders (Eastern Canadian Champions)
Spokane Flyers (Western Canadian Champions)

Best-of-Seven Series
Brantford Alexanders 7 - Spokane Flyers 3
Spokane Flyers 5 - Brantford Alexanders 2
Brantford Alexanders 8 - Spokane Flyers 5
Brantford Alexanders 4 - Spokane Flyers 1
Brantford Alexanders 6 - Spokane Flyers 5 (OT)

External links
Allan Cup archives 
Allan Cup website

Allan Cup